This is a partial list of Finnish sportspeople. For the full plain list of Finnish sportspeople on Wikipedia, see :Category:Finnish sportspeople.

Alpine skiing
Kalle Palander
Tanja Poutiainen

Archery
Ismo Falck
Kyösti Laasonen
Jari Lipponen
Päivi Meriluoto
Tomi Poikolainen

Athletics
Arto Bryggare
Arsi Harju
Arto Härkönen
Antti Kalliomäki
Tapio Kantanen
Jorma Kinnunen
Tapio Korjus
Tiina Lillak
Kaarlo Maaninka
Paavo Nurmi
Tero Pitkämäki
Seppo Räty
Heli Rantanen
Antti Ruuskanen
Hannu Siitonen
Juha Tiainen
Pekka Vasala
Lasse Virén

Auto racing
Valtteri Bottas
Antti Buri
Niclas Grönholm
Emma Kimiläinen
Leo Kinnunen
Heikki Kovalainen
Mikko Kozarowitzky
Jesse Krohn
Patrick Kujala
Matias Laine
JJ Lehto
Mika Mäki
Tommi Mäkinen
Markus Niemelä
Jari Nurminen
Markus Palttala
Rory Penttinen
Kimi Räikkönen
Harri Rovanperä
Kalle Rovanperä
Keke Rosberg
Mika Salo
Toni Vilander

Basketball

Petteri Koponen (born 1988) – basketball player, first Finnish first round pick in NBA draft
Lauri Markkanen (born 1997) – basketball player, currently with the NBA's Chicago Bulls
Hanno Möttölä (born 1976) – basketball player, first Finnish NBA player
 Miron Ruina (born 1998) - Finnish-Israeli basketball player

Beach volleyball
Emilia Nyström
Erika Nyström

Biathlon
Väinö Bremer
Harri Eloranta
August Eskelinen
Henrik Flöjt
Heikki Hirvonen
Heikki Ikola
Martti Lappalainen
Kaisa Mäkäräinen
Ville Räikkönen
Mauri Röppänen
Esko Saira
Juhani Suutarinen
Antti Tyrväinen

Boxing
Jyri Kjäll
Arto Nilsson
Joni Nyman
Reima Virtanen

Canoeing
Mikko Kolehmainen

Cross-country skiing

Toimi Alatalo
Veikko Hakulinen
Kalevi Hämäläinen
Heikki Hasu
Mirja Hietamies
Väinö Huhtala
Eija Hyytiäinen
Jari Isometsä
Kalle Jalkanen
Sami Jauhojärvi
Klaes Karppinen
Harri Kirvesniemi
Marja-Liisa Kirvesniemi
August Kiuru
Marjatta Kajosmaa
Aki Karvonen
Arto Koivisto
Eero Kolehmainen
Urpo Korhonen
Jorma Kortelainen
Mika Kuusisto
Anne Kyllönen
Matti Lähde
Krista Lähteenmäki
Teuvo Laukkanen
Kalevi Laurila
Mirja Lehtonen
Väinö Liikkanen
Paavo Lonkila
Pirkko Määttä
Tapio Mäkelä
Eero Mäntyranta
Marjo Matikainen-Kallström
Juha Mieto
Pirjo Muranen
Mika Myllylä
Pekka Niemi
Tapani Niku
Iivo Niskanen
Kerttu Niskanen
Sulo Nurmela
Kalevi Oikarainen
Matti Pitkänen
Sirkka Polkunen
Senja Pusula
Toini Pöysti
Siiri Rantanen
Jari Räsänen
Sami Repo
Hilkka Riihivuori
Kari Ristanen
Marjut Rolig
Riitta-Liisa Roponen
Eeva Ruoppa
Sauli Rytky
Aino-Kaisa Saarinen
Veli Saarinen
Virpi Sarasvuo
Jaana Savolainen
Lauri Silvennoinen
Liisa Suihkonen
Hannu Taipale
Helena Takalo
Pertti Teurajärvi
Arto Tiainen
Benjamin Vanninen
Arvo Viitanen
Lydia Wideman

Curling
Kalle Kiiskinen
Wille Mäkelä
Teemu Salo
Jani Sullanmaa
Markku Uusipaavalniemi

Figure skating
Ludowika Jakobsson
Walter Jakobsson
Petri Kokko
Kiira Korpi
Laura Lepistö
Marcus Nikkanen
Susanna Pöykiö
Susanna Rahkamo

Football
Janne Hannula
Ilpo Verno

Freestyle skiing
Janne Lahtela
Sami Mustonen
Jouni Pellinen
Mikko Ronkainen

Gymnastics
Olli Laiho

Ice hockey
Mikael Granlund
Aarne Honkavaara
Olli Jokinen
Miikka Kiprusoff
Mikko Koivu
Lasse Korhonen
Keijo Kuusela
Jarmo Myllys
Petteri Nummelin
Sami Salo
Teemu Selänne
Jukka Tammi
Esa Tikkanen

Modern pentathlon
Risto Hurme
Berndt Katter
Martti Ketelä
Väinö Korhonen
Olavi Mannonen
Olavi Rokka
Veikko Salminen
Lauri Vilkko

Nordic combined
Heikki Hasu
Martti Huhtala
Jouko Karjalainen
Antti Kuisma
Anssi Koivuranta
Samppa Lajunen
Hannu Manninen
Jari Mantila
Rauno Miettinen
Tapio Nurmela
Jaakko Tallus
Jukka Ylipulli

Rowing
Pertti Karppinen
Minna Nieminen
Sanna Stén

Sailing
Jyrki Järvi
Thomas Johanson
Silja Kanerva
Silja Lehtinen
Jouko Lindgren
Tuuli Petäjä-Sirén
Esko Rechardt
Georg Tallberg
Mikaela Wulff

Shooting
Rauno Bies
Henri Häkkinen
Juha Hirvi
Marko Kemppainen
Satu Mäkelä-Nummela

Ski jumping
Janne Ahonen
Niilo Halonen
Janne Happonen
Matti Hautamäki
Antti Hyvärinen
Risto Jussilainen
Aulis Kallakorpi
Veikko Kankkonen
Tami Kiuru
Risto Laakkonen
Mika Laitinen
Veli-Matti Lindström
Toni Nieminen
Ari-Pekka Nikkola
Matti Nykänen
Jari Puikkonen
Jani Soininen
Jouko Törmänen
Tuomo Ylipulli

Snowboarding
Antti Autti
Janne Korpi
Markku Koski
Markus Malin
Risto Mattila
Ville Paumola
Peetu Piiroinen
Petja Piiroinen
Enni Rukajärvi
Roope Tonteri

Speed skating
Jaakko Friman
Eevi Huttunen
Pentti Lammio
Kaija Mustonen
Antero Ojala
Lassi Parkkinen
Toivo Salonen
Julius Skutnabb
Clas Thunberg
Birger Wasenius

Swimming
Arvo Aaltonen
Antti Kasvio
Jani Sievinen

Tennis
Jarkko Nieminen
Henri Kontinen
Veli Paloheimo

Weightlifting
Kaarlo Kangasniemi
Pekka Niemi

Wrestling
Marko Asell
Risto Björlin
Marko Yli-Hannuksela
Mikko Huhtala
Harri Koskela
Jukka Rauhala
Jouko Salomäki
Tapio Sipilä
Pertti Ukkola

See also
Sport in Finland
Finland at the Olympics
Finland at the Paralympics
Flying Finn

Finland
Finnish sportspeople